FC Metallurg Vidnoye is a Russian football team based in Vidnoye, Moscow Oblast. It was founded in 2020. For 2020–21 season, it received the license for the third-tier Russian Professional Football League. The club did not receive a professional license for the 2022–23 season.

References

Association football clubs established in 2020
Football clubs in Russia
Football in Moscow Oblast
2020 establishments in Russia